The National Communications Centre (NCC) is a South African intelligence agency, and is responsible for bulk electronic surveillance and eavesdropping (otherwise known as SIGINT) of foreign communications. In this respect it serves a role similar to that of the United Kingdom's Government Communications Headquarters or United States National Security Agency.

South African intelligence agencies
Signals intelligence agencies